Harmonic Disruptor is the fifth studio album by American electronic rock band Julien-K, released on April 17, 2020.

Background 
The album was first announced in June 2018 via Facebook. Like the band's previous four releases, an Indiegogo campaign was launched in order to finance the album. It started on June 12, 2018, and aimed for a goal of $10,000; when the campaign ended on July 12 more than $47,000 had been collected.

The album's first single, "Harmonic Disruptor", was released on January 24, 2020 along with its lyric video. On February 14 a music video for "Shut Down Your Soul" was released (while the digital single was published two weeks after), while the third single "Stronger Without You" was premiered on March 20.

Track listing

Personnel 
Julien-K
 Ryan Shuck – vocals, guitar, bass, synths
 Amir Derakh – guitar, bass, programming, synths, production, mixing, recording
 Anthony "Fu" Valcic – programming, synths, recording
 Alex Gonzales – additional vocals on "Cross" and "Burn the System", additional backing vocals on "Stronger Without You", additional drum programming on "Lies Like Fire" and "Burn the System"
 Bidi Cobra – additional programming on "Cross" and "Burn the System", additional noises on "Cross"

Additional musicians
 Mike Marsh – vinyl and digital mastering
 Eric Stoffel – initial programming, additional guitars and backing vocals on "Stronger Without You"
 Galen Wailing – additional noises on "As the Sirens Call"
 Kevin Preston – additional synths on "Undo Everything"
 Brett Carruthers – additional synths on "Undo Everything"

See also
List of 2020 albums

References 

2020 albums
Julien-K albums